LeRoy Butler III (born July 19, 1968) is an American former professional football player who spent his entire 12-year career (1990–2001) as a strong safety for the Green Bay Packers of the National Football League (NFL).

Butler was born in Jacksonville, Florida, where he was challenged by physical problems which forced him to wear leg braces and use a wheelchair at times during his childhood. However, he overcame his disability and was able to excel at high school football; Butler was named one of the 33 best Florida High School football players of all time in 2007. He went on to be a three-year starter at Florida State University, and after a successful college career, he was drafted in the 2nd round (48th overall) of the 1990 NFL Draft by the Packers.

In his 12 seasons with the Packers, Butler was a 4x First-team All-Pro. Butler recorded a sack in the Packers' Super Bowl XXXI win over the New England Patriots, and he is recognized as the creator of the Lambeau Leap touchdown celebration. Butler was named a member of the NFL 1990s All-Decade Team and was enshrined in the Green Bay Packers Hall of Fame. In 2022, he was inducted into the Pro Football Hall of Fame.

High School career
Butler attended Robert E. Lee High School in Jacksonville, Florida, and played under the direction of the all-time wins leader for a high school football coach in the state of Florida's history, Corky Rogers.  Rogers coached at Robert E. Lee High School from 1972 to 1988, where he coached Butler and fellow NFL star Edgar Bennett, and from 1989 to 2016 at The Bolles School in Jacksonville, having won a total of 8 football State Championships.  Before moving onto Florida State, Butler was an astounding player for the Robert E. Lee High School Generals football program.

College career
Butler played under head coach Bobby Bowden at Florida State University. He was a three-year starter, collecting 194 tackles and 9 interceptions, but he's most remembered by FSU fans for his role in the "puntrooskie." In 1988, against rival Clemson, FSU was backed up to its own 21-yard line, on fourth down, with a minute and 30 seconds left to play and the score tied at 21. Bowden called the famous trick play, a fake punt. The snap went to upback Dayne Williams and he slipped the ball to Butler, who ran 78 yards to set up the game-winning field goal.

Professional career

The Green Bay Packers selected Butler in the second round (48th overall) of the 1990 NFL draft. Butler was the third safety drafted in 1990.

He played in 181 games, earned a Super Bowl ring, for Super Bowl XXXI, following the 1996 season, was selected as an All-Pro four times and was selected to the Pro Bowl four times (1993, 1996, 1997, and 1998). He was named to the 1990s NFL All Decade Team, by the Pro Football Hall of Fame, and was later inducted into the Green Bay Packers Hall of Fame, in 2007.

On November 6, 1997, the Green Bay Packers signed Butler to a five-year, $15 million contract extension that includes a signing bonus of $5 million.

On October 7, 1999, the Green Bay Packers signed Butler to a three-year, $21.50 million contract extension that includes a signing bonus of $1.63 million.

After being selected to his first Pro Bowl, the emphasis of his first name was questioned by sports commentator John Madden, who was told by Packers running back Edgar Bennett that his name is pronounced ("LEE-Roy"); but, after hearing a broadcast, Butler's mother sent an e-mail to Madden describing the emphasis as ("L'ROY"). During his 12 seasons with the Packers, he recorded 953 tackles, 38 interceptions, 553 return yards, 12 fumble recoveries, 3 defensive touchdowns and 20½ sacks. He led or tied for the team lead in interceptions in five different seasons. He was the first defensive back in NFL history to gain entrance in the 20 Sack/20 Interception Club.

A broken shoulder blade sustained while tackling Atlanta Falcons running back Maurice Smith in the 2001 season forced him into retirement just before the 2002 season when it was discovered it had not healed properly.

On November 21, 2017, Butler was announced as one of 27 semi-finalists for the 2018 class of the Pro Football Hall of Fame. The nomination was not Butler's first to the Hall of Fame, but marked the first time he was named a semi-finalist for the honor.

On January 2, 2020, he was announced as one of the modern-era finalists for the 2020 class of the Hall of Fame. It was his first time being named as a finalist. He joined 14 other modern-era finalists for the class of 2020. On February 10, 2022, Butler was inducted into the Pro Football Hall of Fame.

Lambeau Leap
Butler is credited with inventing the Lambeau Leap, a touchdown celebration in which the scoring player leaps into the arms of awaiting fans in the stands near the end zone. On December 26, 1993, the Packers were playing the visiting Los Angeles Raiders. On a second-down swing pass to running back Randy Jordan, Butler forced a fumble that was recovered by Reggie White at the Raiders' 35-yard-line. After running with the ball for 10 yards, White lateraled to Butler, who ran the remaining 25 yards into the end zone and then made a spontaneous leap into the arms of fans in the south bleachers. The Packers went on to win 28–0 to clinch what would be the first of six consecutive playoff berths. The move was later popularized by wide receiver Robert Brooks, who carried it a step further by leaping completely into the stands. This move is called the Lambeau Leap and now is used after most Packer touchdowns scored at Lambeau Field.

NFL career statistics

References

1968 births
Living people
American football cornerbacks
American football safeties
Florida State Seminoles football players
Green Bay Packers players
All-American college football players
National Conference Pro Bowl players
Pro Football Hall of Fame inductees
Robert E. Lee High School (Jacksonville) alumni
Players of American football from Jacksonville, Florida
African-American players of American football